Glenns Lake is located in Glacier National Park, in the U. S. state of Montana. Glenns Lake is a long narrow lake located between Cosley Ridge and Whitecrow Mountain in the northeastern region of Glacier National Park.

See also
List of lakes in Glacier County, Montana

References

Lakes of Glacier National Park (U.S.)
Lakes of Glacier County, Montana